Coptosia elyandti is a species of beetle in the family Cerambycidae. It was described by Semenov-Tian-Shanskij in 1891. It is known from Turkmenistan, Kyrgyzstan, Tajikistan, Kazakhstan, and Uzbekistan.

References

Saperdini
Beetles described in 1891
Taxa named by Andrey Semyonov-Tyan-Shansky